Rumpff is a surname. Notable people with the surname include:

Carl Rumpff (1839–1889), German business executive and philanthropist
Frans Lourens Herman Rumpff (1912–1992), South African chief justice
Vincent Rumpff (1789–1867), German diplomat

See also
Rumpf

German-language surnames